Chrysonoma fascialis is a moth of the family Oecophoridae. It is known from Australia and Papua New Guinea.

The wingspan is about 20 mm. Adults have yellow forewings, each with three dark brown stripes. The hindwings are brown.

The larvae feed on the green leaves of Eucalyptus and Lophostemon species. They live in flattened portable cases, made from silk and bits of leaf.

References

Oecophorinae